Burhan Ahmed Sahyouni (born 7 April 1986 in Idlib, Syria) is a Syrian professional footballer. He currently plays for Al-Wahda, which competes in the Syrian Premier League, the top tier of Football in Syria.

International career
Burhan Sahyouni is currently a member of the Syria national football team.
He made 3 appearances for the Syria national football team during the qualifying rounds of the 2010 FIFA World Cup.

International goals
Scores and results table. Syria's goal tally first:

|}

Honours and titles

Club
Al-Jaish
Syrian Premier League: 2009–10

References

External links
 
 

1986 births
Living people
People from Idlib
Association football midfielders
Syrian footballers
Syria international footballers
Syrian expatriate footballers
Expatriate footballers in Iraq
Syrian expatriate sportspeople in Iraq
Al-Jaish Damascus players
Duhok SC players
2011 AFC Asian Cup players
Syrian Premier League players